Édouard Belin (5 March 1876 – 4 March 1963) was a French photographer and inventor. In  1907 Belin invented a phototelegraphic apparatus called the Bélinographe (télestéréographe)—a system for receiving photographs over telephone wires via telegraphic networks. 

Belin's invention had been used for journalistic photos since 1914, and the process was improved by 1921 to enable transmission of images by radio waves.

From 1926, Belin worked on an television apparatus. In 1926, with Holweg, he tested the capacity for the eye to perceive pictures proposed at a very high speed, using a mirror drum.

Belin was born in Vesoul, Haute-Saône, France, and died, aged 86, in Territet, Canton of Vaud, Switzerland.

Bélinographe 
In this apparatus, the transmitter traverses the original image point by point.  At each point a measurement of light intensity is made with an electric eye. The measurement is conveyed to the receiver. There, a variable intensity light source reproduces the light measured by the electric eye, while carrying out same displacements exactly. By doing this, it exposes the photographic paper and makes it possible to obtain a copy of the original image.

Other scientists such as Arthur Korn had also been developing technology to transmit images over long distances.  

Modern telecopiers and photocopiers use the same principle, with this close the sensor of light intensity was replaced by a sensor CCC, and that the device of impression is based on the laser technology, and either photographic.

Legacy 
Belin gave his name to a high school of Vesoul, Haute-Saône, France.

See also
 Display resolution
 Fax
 Gamma correction
 Image scanner
 Telegraphy#Facsimile
 Telerecording (UK)
 Wirephoto

References

External links 

 Comprehensive bibliography of texts by or about Edouard Belin
 Radio Reproduces Note Across Ocean, 5 August 1921, from Today in Science History 
 Edouard Belin – Fax and Belinographe Inventor at FaxAuthority.com

1876 births
1963 deaths
People from Vesoul
20th-century French inventors
Grand Officiers of the Légion d'honneur
Telegraph engineers and inventors